René Egger (12 September 1915 - 16 February 2016) was a French Modernist architect. He worked with Fernand Pouillon from 1944 to 1953. Over the course of his career, he designed many buildings in Marseille, including more than 150 university and school buildings. He also designed the Hôpital Nord, known as "Europe's most modern" hospital when its construction was completed in 1959.

References

1915 births
2016 deaths
Architects from Marseille
20th-century French architects
21st-century French architects
Modernist architects
French centenarians
Men centenarians